Anna Nikolayevna Lazareva (born 31 January 1997) is a Russian professional volleyball player for Fenerbahçe and the Russian National Team.

Career 
Lazareva, who started playing volleyball at a young age, was born in 1997. She took part in the 2014 CEV U20 European Championship with the Russian Junior National Team uniform at the age of 16, and when she was 17, she started wearing the Dynamo Moscow A team jersey. Lazareva, who later took part in the Russian National Team, came second in the Yeltsin Cup in 2017 and received the "Best Young Player" award of the tournament. At the 2019 University Summer Games held in Naples, the young setter diagonal, who won the championship with the Russian National Team with a 3-1 score in the final match against Italy, became the top scorer of the match with 24 points.

Having spent the 2020-2021 season with the Korean team IBK Altos, the successful setter diagonal managed to finish as the leader of statistics in most matches she played. Lazareva, who finished third in the Korean League with the IBK Altos team, became the second top scorer of the league with 867 points in the Korean League. (2020–21)

She signed a contract with Fenerbahçe Opet in Turkey for the 2021-22 season.

References

External links
 Player profile - FIVB
 Player profile - Fenerbahçe Website
Player Profile - Volleyball World

1997 births
Living people
Russian women's volleyball players
Universiade gold medalists for Russia
Universiade medalists in volleyball
Medalists at the 2019 Summer Universiade
Olympic volleyball players of Russia
Volleyball players at the 2020 Summer Olympics
20th-century Russian women
21st-century Russian women